Ramiro Fernández (born 12 November 1995) is an Argentine professional footballer who plays as a left-back for Almirante Brown.

Career
After a youth stint with Villa Dálmine, Puerto Nuevo became Fernández's opening senior club in 2015. He played twenty-two times and scored six goals for them in Primera D Metropolitana as they placed twelfth that year. In 2016, Fernández moved to Defensores Unidos of Primera C Metropolitana. His stay lasted three seasons, with the midfielder making a total of eighty-eight appearances; the club won promotion to Primera B Metropolitana in his final campaign: 2017–18. On 7 June 2018, Acassuso completed the signing of Fernández. He made his debut in a fixture in August against Colegiales.

Career statistics
.

Honours
Defensores Unidos
 Primera C Metropolitana: 2017–18

References

External links

1995 births
Living people
Place of birth missing (living people)
Argentine footballers
Association football fullbacks
Primera D Metropolitana players
Primera C Metropolitana players
Primera B Metropolitana players
Club Atlético Puerto Nuevo players
Defensores Unidos footballers
Club Atlético Acassuso footballers
Club Atlético Atlanta footballers
Club Almirante Brown footballers